Slavoliub Adnagi (born 26 December 1965) is a Romanian politician of Serb descent.

Politics 
He is a member of the Union of Serbs of Romania and has been serving as a Member of the Chamber of Deputies of Romania since 2016. He is part of the "Parliamentary Group of National Minorities" and is a member of the friendship groups with Serbia, Austria, Switzerland and Latvia. Due to his efforts, the day of Saint Sava got proclaimed a national holiday in Romania.

See also 

 Serbs of Romania
 Parliament of Romania

References 

Politicians from Timișoara
1965 births
Living people
Romanian politicians of Serbian descent
Members of the Chamber of Deputies (Romania)